Crambione is a genus of jellyfish in the family Catostylidae.

References

Notes 

Catostylidae
Scyphozoan genera